Stellenbosch Football Club is a South African professional football club founded in 2016 following the relocation of Vasco da Gama F.C. to Stellenbosch, Western Cape. It is the first Premier Soccer League (PSL) team to be based in Stellenbosch, and plays home games at Danie Craven Stadium and Idas Valley Stadium.

History

The club was formed in August 2016 when the Premier Soccer League Executive Committee approved the application from National First Division side, Vasco Da Gama for a name change following the relocation from Parow to the Stellenbosch Academy of Sport (SAS) in Stellenbosch. Stellenbosch F.C.'s first National First Division game was played on August 28, 2016. Stanley Muishond scored the first goal in team history in a 3–1 loss to Mthatha Bucks. On 1 December 2016, Stellenbosch confirmed that Steve Barker had joined Sammy Troughton in a joint-coach position. The Cape Winelands side finished their inaugural season in third, clinching the final promotion/relegation playoff spot by one point. However, Stellies finished last in the mini-league. Following an unsuccessful attempt to gain promotion to the Absa Premiership Stellenbosch parted ways with head coach Sammy Troughton.

In 2017, Stellenbosch's second season, the team recorded ten wins and ten losses in the thirty matches of the season. The team failed to qualify for the playoffs, finishing eighth. In August 2018, the Stellenbosch Academy of Sport purchased Stellenbosch Football Club. 

The final round of the 2018–19 National First Division season saw Steve Barker's Stellenbosch F.C. confirm their title victory – and promotion to the Absa Premiership (now DSTv Premiership) – with a 0–0 draw at home to Maccabi F.C.

On 25 October 2020, Stellenbosch F.C. made history by playing the first PSL game (against Moroka Swallows F.C.) at the Danie Craven Stadium. This stadium is traditionally a rugby stadium and, as of 2020, is one of the two venues for Stellenbosch F.C. home games in Stellenbosch. DSTv Diski Challenge matches are played at Idas Valley Stadium, while DStv Premiership games are played at the Danie Craven Stadium.

The Chief Operating Officer at the club, Rob Benadie stated "The name 'Stellenbosch FC' shows our intention of creating a club that symbolises the Cape Winelands community. We are on a pathway of building something special‚ and we want to take this community with us."

The crest of the club features a bunch of grapes, as Stellenbosch is based within the Cape Winelands District Municipality.

Current squad

Honours
 Next Gen Cup:
 Winners: 2022 (Under-23)

References

External links

Premier Soccer League

 
Soccer clubs in South Africa
Association football clubs established in 2016
National First Division clubs
2016 establishments in South Africa
Stellenbosch